Wheelabout Creek is a stream in the U.S. state of Ohio.

Wheelabout Creek is noted for its irregular course.

See also
List of rivers of Ohio

References

Rivers of Vinton County, Ohio
Rivers of Ohio